Yi Kuk-no (August 28, 1893 – 1978) was born in Uiryeong, Gyeongsangnam-do, as a descendant of the 15th generation of Jeon Il-join, the 28th-year-old Ulsan Hwasu Association of Jeonui Yean, and the 15th-year-old commander of the Joseon Dynasty. He was an independent activist who was active during the Japanese colonial period, was the chairman of the Korean Language Society and, was a Hangeul scholar. He served with liberation while serving, accompanied by Mr. Baek Kim, a party secretary, and remained in the war. Following the establishment of the Democratic People's Republic of Korea, he served as Minister without portfolio and was a member of the Standing Committee of the Supreme People's Assembly.

Biography
Yi Kuk-no was born on August 28, 1893, in a farmhouse in Dugok-ri, Jeongjeong-myeon, Uiryeong County, South Gyeongsang Province, studied at Seodang, and entered Masan Changsin School in 1910. In 1912, he fled to Seogan Island to become an independent army.

In 1912, he met Yoon Se-bok, who became the third-generation head of the Great Religion at Hoi Inhyeon School of Alumni, and returned to the Great Religion. After closing the alumni school, in 1915, Musong County Baeksan School again taught students. Then, after crossing to Shanghai, China, he entered the Dongje University, run by Germans, and had the opportunity to systematically experience Western studies.

After graduating from Dongje University in Shanghai in 1920, he graduated from the Department of Philosophy at Humboldt University in Berlin, Germany in 1927. He Participated in the study of Hangul orthography in the mid-Japanese period during the Japanese colonial period, he was a member of the Korean language dictionary compilation committee in 1929, a member of the Korean Hangul Spelling Act in 1930, a member of the Korean Language Standards Assessment Committee in 1935, and a full-time member of the Korean language dictionary compilation committee in 1936.

On October 1, 1942, he was arrested for a Korean language activity, sentenced to 6 years in prison at the Hamhung Court, and served in the Hamhung Prison and released after liberation in August 1945. In 1946, he served as Chairman of the Kunminhoe, and in April 1948, he went to Pyongyang to join political forces there. In September 1948, following the formal declaration on the establishment of North Korea, he was elected to a deputy in the Supreme People's Assembly and served as a minister without portfolio in the Cabinet of North Korea led by Premier Kim Il-sung. In 1949 he became the chairman of the Central Committee of the Democratic Front for the Reunification of Korea candidate for the Academy of Sciences of the Democratic People's Republic of Korea, vice-chairman of the Standing Committee of the Supreme People's Assembly in 1953, In 1962 he became director of the Institute of Korean Language and Literature of the Academy of Sciences of the Democratic People's Republic of Korea, Chairman of the Central Committee of the Fatherland Front in 1966, Chairman of the Committee for the Peaceful Reunification of the Fatherland in 1970, and Vice Chairman of the People's Committee in Yanggang Province in 1972.

References

Government ministers of North Korea
Workers' Party of Korea politicians
Korean communists
Year of birth unknown
1978 deaths
Members of the 1st Supreme People's Assembly
Members of the 2nd Supreme People's Assembly
Members of the 3rd Supreme People's Assembly